The red sea urchin (Mesocentrotus franciscanus) is a sea urchin found in the northeastern Pacific Ocean from Alaska to Baja California.

Description

A sea urchin's spherical body is completely covered by sharp spines. These spines grow on a hard shell called the "test", which encloses the animal.  It can vary in color from red to dark burgundy. Rarely, albino specimens are found. It has a mouth located on its underside, which is surrounded by five teeth. During larval development, the body of a sea urchin transitions from bilateral to radial symmetry.

This bilaterally symmetrical larva, called an echinopluteus, subsequently develops a type of pentaradiate symmetry that characterizes echinoderms. It crawls very slowly over the sea bottom using its spines as stilts, with the help of its tube feet. Scattered among its spines are rows of tiny tube feet with suckers that help it to move and stick to the sea floor.

Feeding habits
This animal has a mouth with special jaws (Aristotle's lantern) located on the bottom (oral) surface. Its preferred diet is seaweeds and algae, which it scrapes off and tears up from the sea floor. During larval development, urchins use bands of cilia to capture food from the water column. Red sea urchins found in the channel adjacent to San Juan Island have been found to live a uniquely sedentary lifestyle with the heavy currents bringing an abundance of food.

Behavior and reproduction
Sea urchins are often found living in clumps from five to ten. They have the ability to regenerate lost spines. Lifespan often exceeds 30 years, and scientists have found some specimens to be over 200 years old. Red sea urchins are notoriously ravenous kelp-eaters and are implicated in devastating kelp beds by forming grazing fronts. The intense grazing pressure exerted by urchins is an important link in a trophic cascade often observed along the west coast of North America in which sea otter predation influences urchin abundance, which in turn influences kelp devastation. In contrast to their negatively perceived impact on community structure in open coastal kelp beds, the sedentary behavior and capture of detrital seaweed in the San Juan Islands is hypothesized to create an important habitat and energy source below the photic zone. These diverse ecosystem effects of red urchins highlight their importance as ecosystem engineers in temperate rocky reef ecosystems.

Spawning peaks between June and September. Eggs are fertilized externally while they float in the ocean, and planktonic larvae remain in the water column for about a month before settling on the bottom of the sea floor, where they undergo metamorphosis into juvenile urchins. These juveniles use chemical cues to locate adults. Although juveniles are found almost exclusively under aggregated adults, the adults and juveniles are not directly related.

References

External links

The sea urchin genome project
Pacific Urchin Harvesters Association
 

Strongylocentrotidae
Animals described in 1863
Sea urchins as food